Pleckstrin homology-like domain family B member 2 is a protein that in humans is encoded by the PHLDB2 gene.

Interactions
PHLDB2 has been shown to interact with FLNC.

References

Further reading